The Venezuela national tennis team represents Venezuela in Davis Cup tennis competition and are governed by the Federación Venezolana de Tenis.

Venezuela currently compete in the Americas Zone Group I.  They have never competed in the World Group, but reached the Play-offs in 1995 and 2002.

History
Venezuela competed in its first Davis Cup in 1957.

Current team (2022) 

 Ricardo Rodríguez-Pace
 Brandon Pérez
 Rafael Abdul Salam
 Francisco Sinopoli

See also
Davis Cup
Venezuela Fed Cup team

External links

Davis Cup teams
Davis Cup
Davis Cup